Droppin' Bombs (also titled as Droppin' Bombs: The Definitive Trouble Funk) is a double-compilation album released on August 25, 1998 by the Washington, D.C.-based go-go band Trouble Funk.

Track listing
Disc 1
"Don't Touch That Stereo" – 5:56
"Pump Me Up" – 6:33
"Drop the Bomb" – 5:55
"Don't Try To Use Me" – 6:13
"Trouble Funk Express" – 6:40
"Hey Fellas" – 7:12
"Supergrit" – 10:13

Disc 2
"So Early in the Morning" – 7:03
"Freaky Situation" – 3:58
"Let's Get Small" – 5:33
"Say What" – 5:13
"E Flat Boogie" – 8:47
"Still Smokin'" – 5:08
"Good to Go" – 8:04
"I'm Chillin'" (featuring Kurtis Blow) – 5:52

Personnel
Tony Fisher – bass guitar
Emmett Nixon – drums
Robert Reed – keyboards, trombone
James Avery – keyboards
Chester Davis – electric guitar
Timothy Smith – percussion
Mack Carey – percussion
Dennis "Fatz" Sterling – percussion, rototoms, cowbell
David Rudd – saxophone
Gerald Reed – trombone
Taylor Reed – trumpet

References

External links
Droppin' Bombs at Discogs

1998 compilation albums
Trouble Funk albums
Rhythm and blues compilation albums